Rick DeSaulniers is a Canadian politician, who was elected to the Legislative Assembly of New Brunswick in the 2018 election. He represented the electoral district of Fredericton-York as a member of the People's Alliance of New Brunswick. He lost his seat in the 2020 general election.

Election results

References

Living people
People's Alliance of New Brunswick MLAs
Year of birth missing (living people)
21st-century Canadian politicians
People from Fredericton